Kladje nad Blanco is a settlement east of Blanca on the left bank of the Sava River in the Municipality of Sevnica in central Slovenia. The area is part of the historical region of Styria. The municipality is now included in the Lower Sava Statistical Region.

Name
The name of the settlement was changed from Kladje to Kladje nad Blanco in 1953.

Cultural heritage
There are two Iron Age burial mounds near the settlement. Although they do not belong to the same era, local legend associates them with Attila's grave.

References

External links
Kladje nad Blanco at Geopedia

Populated places in the Municipality of Sevnica